Antonio Ruíz de Morales y Molina, O.S. (died 1576) was a Roman Catholic prelate who served as Bishop of Tlaxcala (1572–1576) and Bishop of Michoacán (1566–1572).

Biography
Antonio Ruíz de Morales y Molina was born in Córdoba, Spain and ordained a priest in the Order of Santiago.
On 15 May 1566, he was appointed during the papacy of Pope Pius V as Bishop of Michoacán.
On 10 December 1572, he was appointed during the papacy of Pope Gregory XIII as Bishop of Tlaxcala and installed on 8 October 1573.
He served as Bishop of Tlaxcala until his death on 17 July 1576. 
While bishop, he was the principal consecrator of Pedro de Moya y Contreras, Archbishop of México (1573); and the principal co-consecrator of Juan de Medina Rincón y de la Vega, Bishop of Michoacán (1574).

References

External links and additional sources
 (for Chronology of Bishops) 
 (for Chronology of Bishops) 
 (for Chronology of Bishops) 
 (for Chronology of Bishops) 

16th-century Roman Catholic bishops in Mexico
Bishops appointed by Pope Pius V
Bishops appointed by Pope Gregory XIII
1576 deaths